A shiv, also chiv, schiv, shivvie, or shank, is a handcrafted bladed-weapon resembling a knife that is commonly associated with prison inmates. 

Since weapons are highly prohibited in the prison environment, the intended mode of concealment is central to a shiv's construction. An especially thin handle, for instance, makes it easier to conceal in available cracks or crevices in the prison's construction, or in stacks of objects, such as books, permitted to the prisoners; however, this can also render the shiv difficult to grip and wield. Routine body searches in prison makes it difficult to conceal a shiv on one's person on a continuous basis. Beyond the prison authorities, it is also desirable to conceal possession of a shiv from members of rival prison populations. 

The word is recorded from the 1670s in the spelling chive as cant for knife, whose pronunciation is reflected in the spelling shiv recorded in underworld slang from 1915 and possibly used since the 1890s or earlier. The cant word probably came from the Romani word chiv for "blade" (compare Romani chivomengro "knifeman"). The derived verb shiv means "to stab someone", and a shivver is an archaic or rarely used term for a criminal who attacks victims with a knife.

Usage 
The word is prison slang for an improvised knife.  The word generally applies to both stabbing and edged weapons. A shiv can be anything from a glass shard with fabric wrapped around one end to form a handle, to a razor blade stuck in the end of a toothbrush, to a simple toothbrush handle, filed into a sharp point.

In the 1950s, British criminal Billy Hill described his use of the shiv: 

In the Federal Bureau of Prisons, weapons, sharpened instruments, and knives are considered contraband and their possession is punishable as a highest severity-level prohibited act.

References

Knives
Prison-related crime
Improvised weapons